Jack Burkitt (19 January 1926 – 12 September 2003) was an English professional footballer, who made over 500 senior appearances for Nottingham Forest between 1947 and 1962 and who captained them to win the 1959 FA Cup Final.

Nottingham Forest
He started at his local club Darlaston and joined Forest at the start of the 1947–48 season. He went on to make 503 senior appearances for Forest (a club record at the time) and scored 15 goals for them, and during his time at the club Forest won two promotions and defeated Luton Town in the 1959 FA Cup final. After his playing career finished he remained at the club as one of the coaching staff.

Notts County and Derby County
He became manager of Notts County in 1966. The following year he joined Derby County as trainer under Brian Clough. He left them due to ill health in 1969.

Death
He died on 12 September 2003 in Brighouse of Lewy body disease. This disease is believed to be related to frequent heading of the heavy leather footballs used in the 1950s and 60s.

Honours

Nottingham Forest

 FA Cup: 1959

References

External links 
 

English Football League players
Nottingham Forest F.C. players
1926 births
2003 deaths
Darlaston Town F.C. players
Notts County F.C. managers
Association football midfielders
English footballers
English football managers
Sportspeople from Wednesbury
FA Cup Final players